Richard James O'Sullivan (1826–1889) was a New Zealand teacher and school inspector. He was born in Kilkenny, County Kilkenny, Ireland, in about 1826. He was a teacher at St Peter's School, Auckland and taught many early native-born  Aucklanders, including later cabinet ministers, John Sheehan and Joseph Tole, Mayor of Auckland Peter Dignan and Charles and William Outhwaite.

References

1826 births
1889 deaths
Irish emigrants to New Zealand (before 1923)
New Zealand schoolteachers
School inspectors
People from Kilkenny (city)
St Peter's College, Auckland
St Peter's College, Auckland faculty